The 1992 United States Senate election in Kansas took place on November 3, 1992. Incumbent Republican senator Bob Dole won re-election to a fifth term, defeating Democratic nominee Gloria O'Dell. Nearly two decades after his failed vice-presidential bid in 1976, this would be Dole's last election to the Senate. He would resign in 1996 while running for President of the United States. Dole also became the Republican Leader of the United States Senate seven years prior.

Major candidates

Democratic
 Gloria O'Dell, teacher and former journalist
 Fred Phelps, pastor

In the Democratic primary, O'Dell defeated Fred Phelps, the highly controversial pastor of the Westboro Baptist Church.

Republican
 Bob Dole, incumbent U.S. Senator

Results

See also
 1992 United States Senate elections

References

Kansas
1992
1992 Kansas elections
Bob Dole